The HTC S640 (a.k.a. The HTC Iris) is a smartphone manufactured by High Tech Computer Corporation exclusively for Telus clients.

Availability

As of October 2007, the phone has been offered exclusively from Telus.

See also
High Tech Computer Corporation, a Taiwan-based manufacturer of handheld devices

External links
 Official HTC Site
 Telus S640 Spec Sheet

References

Iris
Windows Mobile Standard devices